The following table and map show the areas in Ireland, previously designated as Cities, Boroughs, or Towns in the Local Government Act 2001.

Under the Local Government (Ireland) Act 1898, Ireland had a two-tier system of local authorities. The first tier consisted of administrative counties and county boroughs. The county boroughs were in the major municipal population centres. The second tier consisted of urban districts, governed by urban district councils; some of the urban district retained a higher status of borough with a corporation. Below that were towns with town commissioners, administered under the Towns Improvement (Ireland) Act 1854.

Under the Local Government Act 2001, administrative counties and county boroughs were redesignated as counties and cities respectively. The lower tier consisted of boroughs and towns (including both former urban districts and towns administered by town commissioners).

Under the Local Government Reform Act 2014, only Dublin, Cork and Galway retain separate city councils. Limerick and Waterford were merged into the corresponding county councils and all borough and town councils were abolished. Municipal districts were created from local electoral areas with councillors being those elected to the county councils. In the case of Limerick and Waterford, these are called Metropolitan Districts; in the case of Drogheda, Wexford, Sligo and Clonmel, these are called Borough Districts; and in the case of Kilkenny, it is called the Municipal District of Kilkenny City.

Explanation of table

Cities, boroughs and towns up to 2014

Map

See also
 Local government in the Republic of Ireland explains the powers of former municipal councils
 List of census towns in the Republic of Ireland includes non-municipal towns and villages

Notes

References

Further reading
  Central Statistics Office, 2012 Census 2011 Population Classified by Area (Formerly Volume One)

 
Local government in the Republic of Ireland
Cities, boroughs